Bolsover Colliery Football Club was an English association football club based in Bolsover, Derbyshire. It competed in the FA Cup in the late 1940s.

References

Defunct football clubs in Derbyshire
Bolsover
Sheffield Association League
Yorkshire Football League
Central Combination
Mining association football teams in England
Defunct football clubs in England